The Thomas Elwood Lindsey House is an historic home located in Paoli Township, Orange County, Indiana.

History
The Thomas Elwood Lindley House was built on land granted in 1812 for Jonathan Lindley when he left North Carolina to settle in Orange County, Indiana.

Jonathan was the grandfather of Thomas Elwood Lindley, and an influential Quaker. He served in the State Legislature at the Capitol in Corydon, Indiana. The property remained in the Lindley Family until it was deeded to the Orange County Historical Society in 1974 by the great-great-grandson, H. Carl Thompson and Dorothy Farlow Thompson. The house is restored to reflect the period 1850-1869 when it was used as a farm home. It was listed on the National Register of Historic Places in 1985.

References

External links
 The Lindley House - Orange County Historical Society

Houses on the National Register of Historic Places in Indiana
Greek Revival houses in Indiana
Museums in Orange County, Indiana
Historic house museums in Indiana
Houses in Orange County, Indiana
National Register of Historic Places in Orange County, Indiana